Francisco Fattoruso (born August 10, 1979, in Las Vegas, Nevada) is a Uruguayan musician and bass player.

He is the son of Hugo Fattoruso and María de Fátima Quinhões, both of them musicians.

He has played with several artists such as: Rubén Rada, Illya Kuryaki and the Valderramas,  Abuela Coca, Pepe Guerra, Silicon Fly, Warren Riker, Dante, Emmanuel Horvilleur, Deitrick Hadden, Liliana Herrero, Milton Nascimento, Elefante, NN Opera, La Trampa, Molotov, Oteil Burbridge, Derek Trucks, Blueground Undergrass, Gary Buho Gazaway, David Haynes, Yonrico Scott, Silk, Philipia, Malachi, Lazyeye, Reggie Hines, Ike Stubblefield, Charly García, Right On, Tim McDonald, Elizabeth Baptist Church, Tabernacle Baptist Church, The Soul Factory, Voices Of Faith, Claudio Taddei, Hugo Fattoruso, Anita no Duerme, Jorge Drexler, Daniel Drexler.

Discography
 Trío Fattoruso (2001)
 Cleptodonte
 Trío Fattoruso En vivo en Medio y Medio (2005)
 Bacteria
 Francisco Fattoruso
 The House of the Groove (2007)
 Music Adventure (2013)
 Khronos (2016

References

External links
"Trio Fattoruso"

1979 births
Living people
People from the Las Vegas Valley
21st-century Uruguayan male singers
Uruguayan bass guitarists
Male bass guitarists
Jazz fusion bass guitarists
Uruguayan composers
Male composers
Uruguayan jazz musicians
21st-century bass guitarists
Male jazz musicians
Uruguayan male guitarists